Conospermum hookeri, commonly known as the Tasmanian smokebush, is a plant endemic to Tasmania.

References

External links

hookeri